Changing the Game is a 2012 dramatic film starring Sean Riggs, Tony Todd, Raw Leiba, Sticky Fingaz, Brandon Ruckdashel and Irma P. Hall and directed by Rel Dowdell. The film opened theatrically by AMC Theatres in New York, Philadelphia, Chicago, DC, Atlanta and was cited by the noted website FilmFresh.com as one of the top three African-American films of 2012. The film recently premiered on May 15, 2014 on cable channel BET as the "Movie of the Week."

Plot
Darrel (Riggs) is a supremely intelligent African-American man who rises from the tough streets of Philadelphia to the world of high finance on Wall Street. He soon learns the white-collar world is filled with as much crime as the drug-filled hood he left behind.

Cast
 Sean Riggs as Darrell Barnes
 Tony Todd as Curtis the Diabolical / FBI Agent
 Irma P. Hall as Grandma Barnes, Darrell's grandmother
 Sticky Fingaz as Craig
 Brandon Ruckdashel as Marty Levine
 Munir R. Kreidie as Obul Metha
 Dennis L.A. White as Andre "Dre" Newell
 Mari White as Jennifer
 Suzzanne Douglas as Mrs. Davis, Darrell's teacher
 Raw Leiba as Balu
 Elizabeth Marie Camacho as Julissa, Sexy Flight Attendant
 Charli Baltimore as News Reporter

See also
List of black films of the 2010s

References

External links 
 

2012 films
American drama films
Films set in the 2010s
2012 drama films
American independent films
Hood films
Films about race and ethnicity
Films set in Philadelphia
2012 independent films
2010s English-language films
2010s American films